Georgia's 58th House district covers parts of DeKalb and Fulton counties. Since 1972, the district is located in eastern Atlanta and includes the following neighbourhoods: East Atlanta, Cabbagetown, Reynoldstown, Edgewood, Gresham Park, Grant Park, Kirkwood, Ormewood Park and Boulevard Heights.

Prior to 1972, the district was located in Wayne County.

List of elected representatives

References

58
DeKalb County, Georgia
Fulton County, Georgia